Prunus obtusata is a species of bird cherry native to Tibet, southern China and Taiwan, preferring to grow at 800–3600m. It is a tree typically 6–20m tall. Its flowers are borne on a raceme, with white petals. The fruit is black.

Ecology
Its young leaves are consumed by the endangered Guizhou snub-nosed monkey, Rhinopithecus brelichi.

References

obtusata
Bird cherries
Flora of Tibet
Flora of South-Central China
Flora of Southeast China
Flora of Taiwan
Plants described in 1911